Patrick S. Druckenmiller is a Mesozoic paleontologist, taxonomist, associate professor of geology, Earth Sciences curator, and museum director of the University of Alaska Museum of the North, where he oversees the largest single collection of Alaskan invertebrate and vertebrate fossils. He has published work on plesiosaurs, ichthyosaurs, mastodons, and dinosaurs in the United States, Svalbard, and Canada. He has co-authored papers on discussions of mass extinctions and biogeography.  Much of his work has focused on Arctic species. He is a member of the Spitsbergen Jurassic Research group, which focuses on marine reptiles. Druckenmiller has named many new genera and species, including Edgarosaurus muddi, Nichollsia borealis, Athabascasaurus bitumineus, Cryopterygius kristiansenae, Spitrasaurus larseni, and Spitrasaurus wensaasi.

Education
Druckenmiller has served as a curator and as a faculty member in the University of Alaska, Fairbanks since 2007. Druckenmiller worked at the Museum of the Rockies in Bozeman, Montana, before coming to Alaska. He holds a Ph.D. from the University of Calgary in Alberta and a master's degree from Montana State University in Bozeman, where he worked under paleontologist Jack Horner.

Arctic research
Much of Druckenmiller's work focuses on cold-hardy, high-latitude prehistoric animals. In 2015, he and his student named a new species of a duck-billed, plant-eating dinosaur, Ugrunaaluk kuukpikensis,, that apparently lived in the snowy Arctic year-round. His Arctic research received media attention from National Geographic that wrote about Ugrunaaluk: "The image of tyrannosaurs, horned dinosaurs, and hadrosaurs walking through the cool forests of ancient Alaska has run so counter to the classic Mesozoic imagery that it’s not surprising that this environment has been the subject of several recent documentaries and even a feature film."

Druckenmiller has worked extensively on ichnofossils, including fossil track sites in Denali National Park and Svalbard. Druckenmiller started a five-year project in Denali in partnership with the Park Service to investigate the surrounding polar dinosaurs. As part of this project, they found the first fossilized bone in the park.

Druckenmiller's expertise in organizing safe and successful expeditions into the Arctic was the subject of a Nature article, where Druckenmiller credits his expedition success to the good food. "Good food — high quality and in copious amounts — is essential...After 30 field seasons, Druckenmiller needs only a dry tent to be happy. But he keeps a sharp eye out for anyone who might be overwhelmed by miserable conditions."

Predator X 
In 2009, Druckenmiller was part of the History Channel documentary Predator X, to discuss his find in Svalbard of a pliosaur suggested to have a bite four times stronger than Tyrannosaurus rex. Druckenmiller and his colleagues were later interviewed by National Geographic, The Link, Live Science, and FoxNews. In the Norwegian Journal of Geology, Druckenmiller and colleagues named the creature Pliosaurus funkei. A fictional movie titled "Extinction: Predator X"  was apparently inspired by the documentary and dig.

References 

Year of birth missing (living people)
Living people
University of Calgary alumni
Montana State University alumni
University of Alaska Fairbanks faculty
American paleontologists